This article lists important figures and events in Malaysian public affairs during the year 2004, together with births and deaths of notable Malaysians.

Incumbent political figures

Federal level
Yang di-Pertuan Agong: Tuanku Syed Sirajuddin
Raja Permaisuri Agong: Tuanku Fauziah
Prime Minister: Dato' Sri Abdullah Ahmad Badawi
Deputy Prime Minister: Dato' Sri Najib Tun Razak (from 7 January)
Chief Justice: Ahmad Fairuz Abdul Halim

State level
 Sultan of Johor: Sultan Iskandar
 Sultan of Kedah: Sultan Abdul Halim Muadzam Shah
 Sultan of Kelantan: Sultan Ismail Petra
 Raja of Perlis: Tuanku Syed Faizuddin (Regent)
 Sultan of Perak: Sultan Azlan Shah
 Sultan of Pahang: Sultan Ahmad Shah
 Sultan of Selangor: Sultan Sharafuddin Idris Shah
 Sultan of Terengganu: Sultan Mizan Zainal Abidin (Deputy Yang di-Pertuan Agong)
 Yang di-Pertuan Besar of Negeri Sembilan: Tuanku Jaafar
 Yang di-Pertua Negeri (Governor) of Penang: Tun Abdul Rahman Abbas
 Yang di-Pertua Negeri (Governor) of Malacca:
 Tun Syed Ahmad Al-Haj bin Syed Mahmud Shahabuddin (Until February)
 Tun Mohd Khalid Yaakob (From February)
 Yang di-Pertua Negeri (Governor) of Sarawak: Tun Abang Muhammad Salahuddin
 Yang di-Pertua Negeri (Governor) of Sabah: Tun Ahmad Shah Abdullah (From 1 January)

Events
7 January – Najib Tun Razak was appointed Deputy Prime Minister of Malaysia.
January – Islam Hadhari was introduced by the federal government.
16 January – A 10-year-old girl Nurul Huda Abdul Ghani was raped and murdered at Tenaga Nasional's Tanjung Pelepas intake, Johor.
2 February – Kailan Hassan, the mother of incumbent Malaysian Prime Minister Abdullah Ahmad Badawi died.
15 February – The pilot batch of Malaysia's first National Service program began their training at various camps across Malaysia. Two additional batches joined the program in mid-March.
21 March – The 2004 General Elections. Barisan Nasional coalition won a landslide majority and retook Terengganu from the PAS.
May – Two students from Universiti Teknologi MARA (UiTM), Muhammad Muqharabbin Mokhtarruddin and Ahmad Redzuan Rozal were the first tertiary students from Southeast Asia to reach the peak of Mount Everest.
June – The first polymer notes of Malaysian Ringgit RM 5 were introduced.
1 June – AmFinance Bhd agreed to pay RM52 million to 139 plaintiffs in the lawsuit over the Highland Towers collapse led by Dr Benjamin George.
1 July –  The electronic payment system, Touch 'n Go and Smart TAG, were made compulsory in all Malaysians expressways.
July – RapidKL bus and transit service was launched.
August – Opening of the East Coast Expressway (Phase 1 = Pahang state) from Karak to Kuantan.
31 August – "Puteri Gunung Ledang" (Princess of Mount Ledang (Ophir)) hit the screens.
2 September – Dato' Seri Anwar Ibrahim, the former Deputy Prime Minister, was released after serving six years in prison. He would later lead the opposition party PKR.
12 October – A landslide occurred on the North–South Expressway near Gua Tempurung, Perak.
November – Syarikat Prasarana Negara Berhad (SPNB) handed over the operations of the LRT and bus services to Rapid KL.
30 November – Sharifah Mazlina Syed Abdul Kadir became the first Asian woman to ski-sail across Antarctica.
26 December – The 2004 Indian Ocean earthquake and tsunami killed about 130,000 people including more than 70 Malaysians. The tsunami was observed in Penang, Kedah and Perak.

Births
21 January — Muhammad Alif Farhan Fauzi — Footballer 
22 January — Norman Haikal Rendra Iskandar — Rapper and film producer
2 February — Jaami Qureshi — Footballer 
4 March — Adam Farhan Mohd Faizal — Footballer 
24 March — uHigh — E-sports player
31 March — Redzwan Adha — Actor 
2 April — Muhammad Izrin Ibrahim — Footballer 
2 May — Adam Danieal Azman — Footballer 
4 May — Zulhilmi Sharani — Footballer 
5 May – Aqeesh Aleeya – Singer
8 May — Chong Jing Yi — Film director
22 May – Kabilan M. Narentheran – Actor
1 June — Marcos Tavares Jr — Footballer 
16 June — Nur Amirah Samsuddin — Chef
27 June — Aina Nadhirah Mizarudin — Chef
1 July — Muhammad Adam Rasuli — Actor 
2 July — Idan Aedan — Actor 
29 July — Darwish Anaqi Jamaludin — Chef 
1 September — Siti Nurshuhaini — Badminton player 
21 September — Muhammad Yassin Mohd Hussaini — Film producer 
27 September — Rajveer Singh Deol Kevaleet Singh — Actor
2 October — Muhammad Aliff Izwan Yuslan — Footballer 
3 October — Mohamad Assalam Asyraq Salehudin — Actor 
3 October — Omar Raiyan Kama Azlan — Footballer 
27 October — Mohammad Iqbal Ali — Actor 
2 December — Syafa Wany — Singer 
4 December — Abdul Rahman Daud — Footballer 
27 December — Mohamad Amir Adam Abdul Khir — Film director

Deaths
21 February – Khoo Teck Puat – Business tycoon and founder of Maybank
14 July – Tun Azizan Zainul Abidin – Corporate figure and President of Putrajaya Corporation and Petronas
14 October – Tun Mohamed Zahir Ismail – Speaker of the Dewan Rakyat

See also
 2004
 2003 in Malaysia | 2005 in Malaysia
 History of Malaysia
 List of Malaysian films of 2004

References

 
Years of the 21st century in Malaysia
2000s in Malaysia
Malaysia
Malaysia